Alain Horace (born 4 December 1971) is a former professional footballer who played as a midfielder. He started his career at Mulhouse. After a trial period with Hartlepool, he moved to Ayr United in 1996. Horace left Ayr following a cruciate ligament injury.

References 

1971 births
Living people
French footballers
Association football midfielders
Ligue 2 players
Scottish Football League players
English Football League players
FC Mulhouse players
Hartlepool United F.C. players
Ayr United F.C. players